The Tølløse Line (previously Høng-Tølløse Jernbane (HTJ) is a  long standard gauge single track local passenger railway line between Tølløse and Slagelse in the western part of the island of Zealand, Denmark. It runs from Tølløse station on the Northwest Line to Slagelse station on the Copenhagen–Fredericia/Taulov Line, through a mainly rural area.

The section from Tølløse to Høng opened in 1901, whereas the section from Høng to Slagelse opened in 1898 as part of the now closed Slagelse-Værslev Line. The railway is currently operated by the railway company Lokaltog. Lokaltog runs frequent local train services from Tølløse station to Slagelse station.

History 

The railway line from Tølløse to Høng opened on 22 December 1901 as the Høng-Tølløse Jernbane (HTJ) and connected Tølløse station on the Northwest Line with Høng station on the Slagelse-Værslev Line.

The section from Høng to Slagelse opened on 1 May 1898 as part of the Slagelse-Værslev Line. The section from Høng to Værslev of the Slagelse-Værslev Line was closed on 23 May 1971.

In May 2003, the operating company Høng-Tølløse Jernbane A/S (HTJ) was merged with the operating company of the Odsherred Line, Odsherreds Jernbane A/S, to form the railway company Vestjællands Lokalbaner (VL). On 1 January 2009, Vestsjællands Lokalbaner was again merged with the operating companies of the East Line and the Lolland Line to form the railway company Regionstog A/S (RT) responsible for train operation on four local railways on the islands of Zealand, Lolland and Falster. Regionstog A/S again merged with Lokalbanen A/S on 1 July 2015 to form the railway company Lokaltog A/S which is currently responsible for train operation and related passenger services on the Tølløse Line.

Operations

Trains on the Tølløse Line are operated by the railway company Lokaltog. Lokaltog runs frequent local train services from Tølløse station to Slagelse station.

Stations

 
 
 Udstrup, closed
 
 Bagmarken
 
 , closed in 1975
 
 
 
 
 Konradineslyst, closed
 Hestehaven, opened in 1929, closed in 1974
 
 , closed
 
 , closed in 2011
 , closed in 2011

See also
 List of railway lines in Denmark

References

External links

 Lokaltog

Railway lines in Denmark
Railway lines opened in 1901
Railway lines opened in 1898
Rail transport in Region Zealand